A Lover's Discourse: Fragments is a 1977 book by Roland Barthes. It contains a list of "fragments", some of which come from literature and some from his own philosophical thought, of a lover's point of view. Barthes calls them "figures"—gestures of the lover at work.

Film adaptation
The book was adapted into a Hong Kong movie in Cantonese by directors Derek Tsang and Jimmy Wan called Lover's Discourse  (戀人絮語, 2010). The film consisted of four interconnected stories about love and lovers. The ensemble cast of the film includes Eason Chan, Karena Lam, Kay Tse, Mavis Fan, Eddie Peng, Jacky Heung  and Kit Chen.

French director Claire Denis later adapted the book into the film Let the Sunshine In.

Cultural references 
The lyrical themes on the British duo The Lover Speaks' 1986 eponymous debut album were based on ideas from A Lover's Discourse, with singer David Freeman describing the album as an attempt to produce a "musical cartoon of [Barthes'] book".
A Lover's Discourse is mentioned in, and central to, the plot of Jeffrey Eugenides' novel The Marriage Plot (2011).
Artist Tessa Boffin quoted sections of Barthes' text in a photo-essay titled A Lover's Distance.
Claire Denis's 2017 film, Let the Sunshine In, is based on A Lover's Discourse.
Blythe Roberson's 2019 essay collection How to Date Men When You Hate Men was inspired by and is a "modern response to A Lover's Discourse."

Editions
 A Lover's Discourse: Fragments, translated from the French by Richard Howard, Hill and Wang, (1979),

References

1977 books
Books about the philosophy of love
Books by Roland Barthes
Lover's Discourse